Cacia collarti is a species of beetle in the family Cerambycidae. It was described by Stephan von Breuning in 1960. It originates from the island of Borneo.

References

Cacia (beetle)
Beetles described in 1960